The Brethren of Purity (also The Brethren of Sincerity) were a secret society of Muslim philosophers in Basra, Iraq, in the 9th or 10th century CE.

The structure of the organization and the identities of its members have never been clear.
Their esoteric teachings and philosophy are expounded in an epistolary style in the Encyclopedia of the Brethren of Purity (Rasa'il Ikhwan al-safa'''), a giant compendium of 52 epistles that would greatly influence later encyclopedias. A good deal of Muslim and Western scholarship has been spent on just pinning down the identities of the Brethren and the century in which they were active.

Name
The Arabic phrase Ikhwān aṣ-Ṣafāʾ (short for, among many possible transcriptions, meaning "Brethren of Purity, Loyal Friends, People worthy of praise and Sons of Glory") can be translated as either the "Brethren of Purity" or the "Brethren of Sincerity"; various scholars such as Ian Netton prefer "of Purity" because of the group's ascetic impulses towards purity and salvation.

A suggestion made by Ignác Goldziher, and later written about by Philip Khuri Hitti in his History of the Arabs, is that the name is taken from a story in Kalilah waDimnah, in which a group of animals, by acting as faithful friends (ikhwan al-safa), escape the snares of the hunter. The story concerns a Barbary dove and its companions who get entangled in the net of a hunter seeking birds. Together, they leave themselves and the ensnaring net to a nearby rat, who is gracious enough to gnaw the birds free of the net; impressed by the rat's altruistic deed, a crow becomes the rat's friend. Soon a tortoise and gazelle also join the company of animals. After some time, the gazelle is trapped by another net; with the aid of the others and the good rat, the gazelle is soon freed, but the tortoise fails to leave swiftly enough and is himself captured by the hunter. In the final turn of events, the gazelle repays the tortoise by serving as a decoy and distracting the hunter while the rat and the others free the tortoise. After this, the animals are designated as the "Ikwhan al-Safa".

This story is mentioned as an exemplum when the Brethren speak of mutual aid in one risala (epistle), a crucial part of their system of ethics that has been summarized thus:

Meetings
The Brethren regularly met on a fixed schedule. The meetings apparently took place on three evenings of each month: once near the beginning, in which speeches were given, another towards the middle, apparently concerning astronomy and astrology, and the third between the end of the month and the 25th of that month; during the third one, they recited hymns with philosophical content. During their meetings and possibly also during the three feasts they held, on the dates of the sun's entry into the Zodiac signs "Ram, Cancer, and Balance" (which double as the Vernal Equinox, Summer Solstice, and Autumnal Equinox), beyond the usual lectures and discussions, they would engage in some manner of liturgy reminiscent of the Harranians.

Ranks
Hierarchy was a major theme in their Encyclopedia, and unsurprisingly, the Brethren loosely divided themselves up into four ranks by age; the age guidelines would not have been firm, as for example, such an exemplar of the fourth rank as Jesus would have been too young if the age guidelines were absolute and fixed. Compare the similar division of the Encyclopedia into four sections and the Jabirite symbolism of 4. The ranks were:
 The "Craftsmen" – a craftsman had to be at least 15 years of age; their honorific was the "pious and compassionate" (al-abrār wa 'l-ruhamā).
 The "Political Leaders" – a political leader had to be at least 30 years of age; their honorific was the "good and excellent" (al-akhyār wa 'l-fudalā)
 The "Kings" – a king had to be at least 40 years of age; their honorific was the "excellent and noble" (al-fudalā' al-kirām)
 The "Prophets and Philosophers" – the most aspired-to, the final and highest rank of the Brethren; to become a Prophet or Philosopher a man had to be at least 50 years old; their honorific compared them to historical luminaries such as Jesus, Socrates, or Muhammad who were also classified as Kings; this rank was the "angelic rank" (al-martabat al-malakiyya).

Identities
There have been a number of theories as to the authors of the Brethren. Though some members of the Ikhwan are known, it is not easy to work out exactly who, or how many, were part of this group of writers. The members referred to themselves as "sleepers in the cave" (Rasail 4th, p. 18); a hidden intellectual presence. In one passage they give as their reason for hiding their secrets from the people, not as fear of earthly violence, but as desire to protect their God-given gifts from the world (Rasail 4th, p. 166). Yet they were well aware that their esoteric teachings might provoke unrest, and the various calamities suffered by the successors of the Prophet may have seemed good reason to remain hidden.

Sunni-Sufi connections
Among the theories of the origins of the Ikhwan is that they were Sunnis and that their batini teachings were Sufic in nature. The Rasail contains hadith narrated by Aisha, which is something Shia scholars would not do. Susanne Diwald asserts that the Rasail is Sufi, thus implying a Sunni character. Alessandro Bausani also presented theories of the work being Sunni-Sufi in nature. The Rasail contains reference to the Al Khulafa Al-Rashidun, which is associated with Sunni Islam and also contains a passage in it that denounces the Rafidhi, a term used to describe non-Zaydi Shias, including Ismailis. According to Louis Massignon, the Arab-Andalusian scholar Ibn Sab'in has asserted that the Rasail has a Sunni-Sufi orientation. According to Palestinian historian Abdul Latif Tibawi, the Rasail contains a passage that states that if an ideal Imam dies, then the community can still be governed by consensus (ijma), which is a Sunni concept. According to Tibawi, this idea rejects the Shia concept of continuous leadership based on heredity.

Ismaili Connections
Among the Isma'ili groups and missionaries who favored the Encyclopedia, authorship was sometimes ascribed to one or another "Hidden Imam"; this theory is recounted in al-Qifti's biographical compendium of philosophers and doctors, the "Chronicle of the Learned" (Akhbār al-Hukamā or Tabaqāt-al-Hukamā).pg. 25 of Nasr 1964

Some modern scholars have argued for an Ismaili origin to the writings. Ian Richard Netton  writes in "Muslim Neoplatonists" (London, 1982, p. 80) that: "The Ikhwan's concepts of exegesis of both Quran and Islamic tradition were tinged with the esoterism of the Ismailis." Whilst according to Yves Marquet, "It seems indisputable that the Epistles represent the state of Ismaili doctrine at the time of their compositions" (vide, "Encyclopaedia of Islam", 1960, p. 1071) Bernard Lewis in "The Origins of Ismailism" (London, 1940, p. 44) was more cautious than Fyzee, ranking the Epistles among books which, though "closely related to Ismailism" may not actually have been Ismaili, despite their batini inspiration. Ibn Qifti (d.646/1248), reporting in the 7th/13th century in "Tarikh-i Hukama" (p. 82) that, "Opinions differed about the authors of the Epistles. Some people attributed to an Alid Imam, proffering various names, whereas other put forward as author some early Mutazilite theologians."

Among the Syrian Ismailis, the earliest reference of the Epistles and its relation with the Ismailis is given in "Kitab Fusul wa'l Akhbar" by Nurudin bin Ahmad (d. 233/849). Another important work, "al-Usul wa'l-Ahakam" by Abul-Ma'ali Hatim bin Imran bin Zuhra (d. 498/1104), writes that, "These da'is, and other da'is with them, collaborated in composing long Epistles, fifty-two in number, on various branches of learning." It implies the Epistles being the product of the joint efforts of the Ismaili da'is.

Among the Yemenite traces, the earliest reference of the Epistles is found in the fragments of  "Sirat Ibn Hawshab" by Ja'far ibn Mansur al-Yaman, who writes, "He (Imam Wafi Ahmed)8th Imam of Ismaili sect went through many a difficulty and fear and the destruction of his family, whose description cannot be lengthier, until he issued (ansa'a) the Epistles and was contacted by a man called Abu Gafir from among his dais. He charged him with the mission as was necessary and asked him to keep his identity concealed." This source not only asserts the connection of the Epistles with the Ismailis, but also indicates that the Imam himself was not the sole author (sahibor mu'allif), but only the issuer or presenter (al-munsi). It suggests that the text of the philosophical deliberations was given a final touching by the Imam, and the approved text was delivered to Abu Gafir to be forwarded possibly to the Ikhwan in Basra secretly. Since the orthodox circles and the ruling power had portrayed a wrong image of Ismailism, the names of the (six) compilers were concealed.

The prominent members of the secret association seem to be however, Abul Hasan al-Tirmizi, Abdullah bin Mubarak, Abdullah bin Hamdan, Abdullah bin Maymun, Sa'id bin Hussain etc. The other Yemenite source connecting the Epistles with the Ismailis was the writing of the Tayyibi da'i al-mutlaq Ibrahim ibn al-Husayn al-Hamidi (d. 557/1162), who wrote "Kanz ul-Walad." After him, there followed "al-Anwar ul-Latifa" by Muhammad ibn Tahir (d. 584/1188), "Tanbih al-Ghafilin" by Hatim ibn Ibrahim al-Hamidi (d. 596/1199), "Damigh al-Batil wa hatf ul-Munaazil" by Ali ibn Muhammad ibn al-Walid al-Anf (d. 612/1215), "Risalat al-Waheeda" by al-Hussayn inn Ali al-Anf (d. 667/1268) and "Uyun'ul-Akhbar" by Idris Imad al-Din (d. 872/1468) etc.

al-Tawhīdī
Al-Qifti, however, denigrates this account and instead turns to a comment he discovered, written by Abū Hayyān al-Tawhīdī (d. 1023) in his Kitāb al-Imtā' wa'l-Mu'ānasa (written between 983 and 985), a collection of 37 séances at the court of Ibn Sa'dān, vizier of the Buyid ruler Samsam al-Dawla. Apparently, al-Tawhīdī was close to Zaid ibn Rifa'a, praising his intellect, ability and deep knowledge – indeed, he had dedicated his Kitāb as-Sadiq wa 'l-Sadaqa to Zaid – but he was disappointed that Zaid was not orthodox or consistent in his beliefs, and that he was, as Samuel Miklos Stern puts it:

For many years, this was the only account of the authors' identities, but al-Tawhīdī's comments were second-hand evidence and so unsatisfactory; further, the account is incomplete, as Abu Hayyan mentions that there were others besides these 4.

This situation lasted until al-Tawhīdī's Kitāb al-Imtā' wa'l-Mu'ānasa was published in 1942. This publication substantially supported al-Qifti's work, although al-Qifti apparently toned down the description and prominence of al-Tawhīdī's charges that the Brethren were Batiniyya, an esoteric Ismaili sect and thus heretics, possibly so as to not tar his friend Zaid with the same brush.

Stern derives a further result from the published text of the Kitāb al-Imtā wa 'l-Mu'anasa, pointing out that a story al-Tawhīdī ascribes to a personal meeting with Qadi Abu'l-Hasan 'Alī b. Hārūn az-Zanjāni, the founder of the group, appears in almost identical form in one of the epistles. While neat, Stern's view of things has been challenged by Tibawi, who points out some assumptions and errors Stern has made, such as the relationship between the story in al-Tawhīdī's work and the Epistles; Tibawi points out the possibility that the story was instead taken from a third, independent and prior source.

Al-Tawhīdī's testimony has also been described as thus:

The last contemporary source comes from the surviving portions of the Kitāb Siwan al-Hikma (c. 950) by Abu Sulaiman al-Mantiqi (al-Tawhīdī's teacher; 912–985), which was a sort of compendium of biographies; al-Mantiqi is primarily interested in the Brethren's literary techniques of using parables and stories, and so he says only this little before proceeding to give some extracts of the Encyclopedia:

al-Maqdisī was previously listed in the Basra group of al-Tawhīdī; here Stern and Hamdani differ, with Stern quoting Mantiqi as crediting Maqdisi with 52 epistles, but Hamdani says "By the time of al-Manṭiqī, the Rasā'īl were almost complete (he mentions 51 tracts)."

The second near-contemporary record is another comment by Shahrazūrī as recorded in the Tawārikh al-Hukamā or alternatively, the Tawárykh al-Hokamá; specifically, it is from the Nuzhat al-arwah, which is contained in the Tawārikh, which states:

Hamdani disputes the general abovegoing identifications, pointing out that accounts differ in multiple details, such as whether Zayd was an author or not, whether there was a principal author, and who was in the group or not. He lays particular stress on quotes from the Encyclopedia dating between 954 and 960 in the anonymous (Pseudo-Majriti) work Ghāyat al-Hakīm; al-Maqdisi and al-Zanjani are known to have been active in 983, He finds it implausible they would have written or edited "so large an encyclopedia at least twenty-five to thirty years earlier, that is, around 343/954 to 348/960, when they would have been very young." He explains the al-Tawhidi narrative as being motivated by contemporary politics and issues of hereticism relating to the Qarmatians, and points out that there is proof that Abu Hayyan has fabricated other messages and information.

Amusingly, Aloys Sprenger mentions this in a footnote:

The Epistles of the Brethren of Purity

The Rasa’il Ikhwan al-Safa’ (Epistles of the Brethren of Purity) consist of fifty-two treatises in mathematics, natural sciences, psychology (psychical sciences) and theology. The first part, which is on mathematics, groups fourteen epistles that include treatises in arithmetic, geometry, astronomy, geography, and music, along with tracts in elementary logic, inclusive of: the Isagoge, the Categories, De Interpretatione, the Prior Analytics and the Posterior Analytics. The second part, which is on natural sciences, gathers seventeen epistles on matter and form, generation and corruption, metallurgy, meteorology, a study of the essence of nature, the classes of plants and animals, including a fable. The third part, which is on psychology, comprises ten epistles on the psychical and intellective sciences, dealing with the nature of the intellect and the intelligible, the symbolism of temporal cycles, the mystical essence of love, resurrection, causes and effects, definitions and descriptions. The fourth part deals with theology in eleven epistles, investigating the varieties of religious sects, the virtue of the companionship of the Brethren of Purity, the properties of genuine belief, the nature of the Divine Law, the species of politics, and the essence of magic.

They define a perfect man in their Rasa'il as "of East Persian derivation, of Arabic faith, of Iraqi, that is Babylonian, in education, Hebrew in astuteness, a disciple of Christ in conduct, as pious as a Syrian monk, a Greek in natural sciences, an Indian in the interpretation of mysteries and, above all a Sufi or a mystic in his whole spiritual outlook". There are debates on using this description and other materials of Rasa'il that could help with determination of the identity, affiliation (with Ismaili, Sufism, ...), and other characteristics of Ikhwan al-Safa.

Notes

References
 1998 edition of The Routledge Encyclopedia of Philosophy; ed. Edward Craig, 
 
 
 
 "The authorship of the Epistles of the Ikhwan-as-Safa", by Samuel Miklos Stern, published by Islamic Culture of Hyderabad in 1947
 "Abū Ḥayyan Al-Tawḥīdī and The Brethren of Purity", Abbas Hamdani. International Journal of Middle East Studies'', 9 (1978), 345–353
 

 El-Bizri, Nader (2014) «Ikhwān al-Ṣafāʾ: An Islamic Philosophical Fraternity », in Houari Touati (ed.), Encyclopedia of Mediterranean Humanism.

Further reading
 Critical editions and English translations of the Epistles of the Brethren of Purity published by Oxford University Press in association with the Institute of Ismaili Studies (2008–) https://global.oup.com/academic/content/series/e/epistles-of-the-brethren-of-purity-epbp/?cc=gb&lang=en&

External links

  (PDF version).
 http://ismaili.net/histoire/history04/history428.html
 
 Article at the Encyclopædia Britannica
 "Ikhwanus Safa: A Rational and Liberal Approach to Islam" – (by Asghar Ali Engineer)
 "The Classification of the Sciences according to the Rasa'il Ikhwan al-Safa'" by Godefroid de Callataÿ
 The Institute of Ismaili Studies article on the Brethren, by Nader El-Bizri
 The Institute of Ismaili Studies gallery of images of manuscripts of the Rasa’il of the Ikhwan al-Safa’
 Article in Internet Encyclopedia of Philosophy
 Article in Stanford Encyclopedia of Philosophy

10th-century philosophers
People from Basra
Ismailis
Esoteric schools of thought
Secret societies
10th-century Islam
9th-century Arabic books